
In basketball, a rebound is the act of gaining possession of the ball after a missed field goal or free throw. The National Collegiate Athletic Association's (NCAA) Division I rebounding title is awarded to the player with the highest rebounds per game (rpg) average in a given season. However, from 1956 through 1962, the rebounding leader was determined by the highest individual recoveries out of the total by both teams in all games (meaning the highest percentage of the total possible rebounds determined the winner, not the per game average). The NCAA did not split into its current divisions format until August 1973. From 1906 to 1955, there were no classifications to the NCAA nor its predecessor, the Intercollegiate Athletic Association of the United States (IAAUS). Then, from 1956 to 1973, colleges were classified as either "NCAA University Division (Major College)" or "NCAA College Division (Small College)". The NCAA's official men's basketball media guide recognizes rebounding champions beginning with the 1950–51 season.

Charlie Slack of Marshall owns the Division I record for a single-season rebounding average (25.6), which he accomplished in 1954–55. The all-time career rebounds record holder—Tom Gola of La Salle—never won an NCAA Division I rebounding title despite grabbing 2,201 rebounds. In the official NCAA men's basketball record books, a distinction is drawn between the pre-1973 era and the post-1973 era. One reason is that because of the split into the three Divisions in use today (Divisions I, II and III), many of the rebounds accumulated in the pre-1973 era were against less–talented opponents that would be considered Division II, III or even NAIA in today's hierarchy. Although the 1972–73 season was before the divisional split, the NCAA officially considers that season to be "post-1973" because of the adoption of freshman eligibility for varsity play in all NCAA sports effective in August 1972. Therefore, Kermit Washington of American is the post-1973 Division I single-season rpg record holder. He averaged 20.4 rebounds in 1972–73.

Eight players have earned multiple rebounding titles: Leroy Wright, Jerry Lucas, Artis Gilmore, Kermit Washington, Xavier McDaniel, Paul Millsap, O. D. Anosike, and Alan Williams. Of these, only Millsap earned three NCAA Division I rebounding titles, which he accomplished from 2004 to 2006. He also skipped his senior season to enter the National Basketball Association (NBA) early, so had he stayed at Louisiana Tech he may have won the rebounding title a fourth time. There are also seven players who won Division I rebounding titles that have been enshrined into the Naismith Memorial Basketball Hall of Fame: Elgin Baylor, Artis Gilmore, Jerry Lucas, Hakeem Olajuwon, David Robinson, Spencer Haywood, and Shaquille O'Neal.

Three players who have led the NCAA in rebounds also led the association in scoring as well. Xavier McDaniel was the first to accomplish the feat in the 1984-85 season. That season he averaged 27.2 points and 14.8 rebounds per game for Wichita State University. In 1988-89, Loyola Marymount's Hank Gathers lead the nation with 32.7 points and 13.7 rebounds per game. The last player to lead the country in both categories was Kurt Thomas of Texas Christian University. His 28.9 points and 14.6 rebounds per game topped the NCAA in the 1994-95 season. Gathers was a junior; the other two were seniors.

Six players who have led the NCAA in rebounds were born outside United States territory, and a seventh was born in a United States insular area. Hakeem Olajuwon, the leader in 1983–84, was born in Nigeria; 2009–10 leader Artsiom Parakhouski was born in the Byelorussian SSR of the Soviet Union, which would become the independent country of Belarus in his childhood; 2015–16 leader Egidijus Mockevičius was born in Lithuania; 2016–17 leader Angel Delgado was born in the Dominican Republic; 2020–21 leader Fardaws Aimaq was born in Canada; and 2021–22 leader Oscar Tshiebwe was born in the Democratic Republic of the Congo. Tim Duncan, the 1996–97 leader, was born in the United States Virgin Islands and is a U.S. citizen by birth.

Key

Rebounding leaders

Footnotes

References
General

Specific

NCAA Division I men's basketball statistical leaders